The 2004 Arkansas Democratic presidential primary was held on May 18 in the U.S. state of Arkansas as one of the Democratic Party's statewide nomination contests ahead of the 2004 presidential election.

Results

See also
 2004 Democratic Party presidential primaries
 2004 United States presidential election in Arkansas

References

Arkansas
Democratic presidential primary
2004